Khajan-e Chahar Dang (also Romanized as Khājān-e Chahār Dāng) is a village in Howmeh Rural District, in the Central District of Rasht County, Gilan Province, Iran. At the 2006 census, its population was 553, in 143 families.

References 

Populated places in Rasht County